Cory Silverberg is a Canadian sex educator, author, public speaker, blogger and founding member of Come As You Are.

Silverberg is Jewish, and grew up in a "middle class liberal Canadian home in the '70s." A certified sex educator and former chair of sexuality educator certification for the American Association of Sexuality Educators, Counselors and Therapists, they teach on topics including sex and disability, sex and technology, and pleasure, inclusion, and access across North America.  Silverberg is the co-author of the "Ultimate Guide to Sex and Disability" and since 2005 has been the Sexuality Guide for About.com.

Silverberg's children's book What Makes a Baby was the most funded children's book project on Kickstarter to date, and was released in 2012. In May 2015, Seven Stories Press published Sex Is a Funny Word: A Book about Bodies, Feelings, and YOU, which Maria Popova described as a "candid, inclusive, stereotype-defying, and absolutely wonderful primer on sexuality and gender". In Today's Parent, Tara-Michelle Ziniuk compared the colourful nonfiction book to a "literary Magic School Bus of sex ed".<ref>"Sex Is a Funny Word: A must-read for kids…and parents", article by Tara-Michelle Ziniuk, May 6, 2015, Today's Parent. Retrieved 2016-04-19.</ref>

Silverberg graduated from the Ontario Institute for Studies in Education, from which they received a master's of education.

BooksThe Ultimate Guide to Sex and Disability (2003; OCLC )What Makes a Baby (2012; OCLC )Sex is a Funny Word (2015; OCLC )

Awards
 2014 Lambda Literary Awards Finalist for What Makes a Baby in LGBT Children/Young Adult
 2016 Stonewall Book Award Honor Book in Children's and Young Adult Literature for Sex is a Funny Word 2016 American Library Association Notable Children's Book Award for Sex is a Funny Word 2016 Norma Fleck Award for Canadian Children's Non-Fiction for Sex is a Funny Word 2016 Joe Shuster Award/ Canada's National Comic Book Award Nominee for Sex is a Funny Word 2016 Canadian Children's Book Centre's Best Books for Kids and Teens Award for Sex is a Funny Word  
 2016 Association for Library Service to Children Notable Book for Sex is a Funny Word 2016 Rainbow Book List for Sex is a Funny Word''

References

External links

WhatMakesABaby.com
About.com
Cory Silverberg at The Huffington Post

Living people
Writers from Toronto
Sex educators
Canadian feminist writers
Canadian bloggers
Feminist bloggers
Sex-positive feminists
Male feminists
Canadian relationships and sexuality writers
HuffPost writers and columnists
Year of birth missing (living people)
Jewish feminists
Jewish Canadian writers